Ryan Mark Croasdale (born 26 September 1994) is an English professional footballer who plays as a midfielder for  club Stockport County.

Club career
Croasdale joined Preston North End in 2003 and made his first-team debut at the age of 19 in a Football League Trophy tie against Oldham Athletic, featuring for 45 mins in the 2–0 defeat. A month later, he joined Conference Premier side Tamworth on an emergency one-month loan deal. Croasdale only featured twice for Tamworth against Alfreton Town and Grimsby Town before returning to Preston at the end of the month. In February 2014, Croasdale made the switch to Conference North side Stalybridge Celtic on a loan deal for the remainder of the campaign. Croasdale scored just once during his loan spell, in Stalybridge's 3–1 away victory over Vauxhall Motors. Following the conclusion of the 2013–14 campaign, Croasdale was among the six players released by Preston.

Following his release from Preston, Croasdale joined Sheffield Wednesday in June 2014. However, Croasdale failed to make an impact and was released two years later in June 2016.

On 19 August 2016, Croasdale opted to join National League North side Kidderminster Harriers on a non-contract basis. A day later, he made his debut against his former club, Stalybridge Celtic, in which he featured for twenty minutes in the 2–1 victory. On 29 October 2016, Croasdale scored his first goal for the Harriers in their 1–0 away victory over Stockport County, netting the only goal of the game in the 65th minute. Following an impressive first few months at Kidderminster, Croasdale was rewarded with a long-term contract. On 4 May 2017, Croasdale received his first call-up for the England C squad by manager Paul Fairclough for their fixtures against Panjab and Jersey. After a successful first season, in which Kidderminster reached the play-offs, Croasdale was handed the captain's armband for the 2017–18 campaign.

On 22 June 2018, Croasdale joined National League side AFC Fylde for a club record fee of £50,000.

In September 2020, Croasdale joined Stockport County on a free transfer after an acrimonious departure from Fylde.

Career statistics

Honours
AFC Fylde
FA Trophy: 2018–19

Stockport County
National League: 2021–22

References

External links

1994 births
Living people
Sportspeople from Lancaster, Lancashire
English footballers
Association football midfielders
Preston North End F.C. players
Tamworth F.C. players
Stalybridge Celtic F.C. players
Sheffield Wednesday F.C. players
Kidderminster Harriers F.C. players
AFC Fylde players
Stockport County F.C. players
National League (English football) players